Apensen is a railway station, located in the municipality Apensen, Lower Saxony, in northwestern Germany. It is owned and operated by EVB, with regular trains on the line between Bremerhaven and Buxtehude.

As of 2009, the station was included in the fare zone of the Hamburger Verkehrsverbund.

Train services
The station is served by the following services:

Local services  Cuxhaven - Bremerhaven - Bremervörde - Buxtehude

References

Railway stations in Lower Saxony
Eisenbahnen und Verkehrsbetriebe Elbe-Weser